Józef Dietl (24 January 1804 in Podbuże near Sambor – 18 January 1878 in Kraków) was an Austro-Polish physician born to an Austrian father and Polish mother. He studied medicine in Lviv and Vienna. He was a pioneer in balneology, and a professor of Jagiellonian University, elected as its rector in 1861. Dietl described the kidney ailment known as "Dietl’s Crisis" as well as its treatment.

He is renowned worldwide for being a "reformer of medicine" since he demonstrated through experiments that Bloodletting was useless if not dangerous. His experiments were based on the use of a "control group", a procedure still used today in the so-called "clinical trials" foundation of Evidence-based medicine.

From 1866 to 1874, Dietl was the mayor of Kraków.

References

 

1804 births
1878 deaths
People from Lviv Oblast
People from the Kingdom of Galicia and Lodomeria
Members of the Austrian House of Deputies (1861–1867)
Mayors of Kraków
19th-century Polish physicians
University of Lviv alumni
University of Vienna alumni
Academic staff of Jagiellonian University
Rectors of the Jagiellonian University
Burials at Rakowicki Cemetery